Ottavio Saraceni or Octavius Saraceni (died 1623) was a Roman Catholic prelate who served as Bishop of Sovana (1606–1623).

Biography
On 12 Jun 1606, Ottavio Saraceni was appointed during the papacy of Pope Paul V as Bishop of Sovana.
On 2 Jul 1606, he was consecrated bishop by Giovanni Delfino, Cardinal-Priest of San Marco, with Fabio Blondus de Montealto, Titular Patriarch of Jerusalem, and Bishop Metello Bichi, Bishop Emeritus of Sovana, serving as co-consecrators. 
He served as Bishop of Sovana until his death in 1623.

References

External links
 (for Chronology of Bishops) 
 (for Chronology of Bishops) 

17th-century Italian Roman Catholic bishops
Bishops appointed by Pope Paul V
1623 deaths